A list of works by or about Anthony Lane, British journalist and film critic.

Books

Essays and reporting

1992–1999
 
  Reviews Maurizio Nichetti's Volere Volare (1991) and Lucian Pintilie's The Oak (1992).
  Reviews Baz Luhrmann's Strictly Ballroom (1992) and Tony Bill's Untamed Heart (1993).

2000–2009
  Reviews Charlie Kaufman's Synecdoche, New York (2008) and Kenny Ortega's High School Musical 3 (2008).
  Reviews Danny Boyle's Slumdog Millionaire (2008) and Arnaud Desplechin's A Christmas Tale (2008).

2010–2014
  Reviews Paul Greengrass' Green Zone (2010) and Bong Joon-ho's Mother (2009).
  Reviews Maurice Pialat's L’enfance Nue (1968).
  Reviews Matthew Vaughn's Kick-Ass (2010) and Banksy's Exit Through the Gift Shop (2010).
  Reviews João César Monteiro's Hovering Over the Water (1986).
  Reviews Ridley Scott's Robin Hood (2010).
  Reviews Todd Phillips' Due Date (2010) and Chris Morris's Four Lions (2010).
  
  Reviews Susanne Bier's In a Better World (2010) and James Gunn's Super (2010).
  Reviews Brett Ratner's Tower Heist (2011) and Lars von Trier's Melancholia (2011).
  Reviews Wim Wenders's Pina (2011) and Roman Polanski's Carnage (2011).
  Reviews Otto Preminger's Laura (1944).
 
  Reviews Boris Barnet's Outskirts (1933).
 
  Reviews Steven Spielberg's Lincoln (2012).
  Reviews Andrew Dominik's Killing Them Softly (2012) and Jacques Audiard's Rust and Bone (2012).
  Reviews Tom Hooper's Les Misérables (2012), Quentin Tarantino's Django Unchained (2012) and Michael Haneke's Amour (2012).
  Reviews Paolo and Vittorio Taviani's Caesar Must Die (2012) and Kim Jee-Woon's The Last Stand (2013).
  Reviews John Moore's  A Good Day to Die Hard (2012) and Gael García Bernal's No (2012).
  Reviews Park Chan-wook's Stoker (2013) and Cristian Mungiu's Beyond the Hills (2012).
  Reviews Andrzej Wajda's Ashes and Diamonds (1958).
  Reviews Harmony Korine's Spring Breakers (2012) and Matteo Garrone's Reality (2012).
  Reviews Danny Boyle's Trance (2013) and Pablo Berger's Blancanieves (2012).
  Reviews Jean-Pierre Melville's Un flic (1972).
  Reviews Joseph Kosinski's Oblivion (2013) and François Ozon's In the House (2012).
  Reviews Shane Black's Iron Man 3 (2013) and Olivier Assayas' Something in the Air (2012).
  Reviews Jordan Vogt-Roberts's The Kings of Summer (2013) and Justin Lin's Fast & Furious 6 (2013).
  Reviews Nat Faxon and Jim Rash's The Way, Way Back (2013) and Pedro Almodóvar's I'm so Excited! (2013).
  Reviews Guillermo del Toro's Pacific Rim (2013), Nicolas Winding Refn's Only God Forgives (2013) and Joshua Oppenheimer's The Act of Killing (2012).
  Reviews Ron Howard's Rush (2013) and Stuart Blumberg's Thanks for Sharing (2012).
  Reviews Abdellatif Kechiche's Blue is the Warmest Color (2013).
  Reviews Paolo Sorrentino's The Great Beauty (2013) and Stephen Frears' Philomena (2013).
  Reviews Spike Jonze's Her (2013), Ben Stiller's The Secret Life of Walter Mitty (2013) and John Lee Hancock's Saving Mr. Banks (2013).
  Reviews Claude Lanzmann's The Last of the Unjust (2013).
 
  Reviews Hany Abu-Assad's Omar (2013) and Phil Lord and Christopher Miller's The Lego Movie (2014).
  Reviews Denis Villeneuve's Enemy (2013) and Roger Michell's Le Week-End (2013).
 
  Reviews John Maloof and Charlie Siskel's Finding Vivian Maier (2013) and Bertrand Tavernier's The French Minister (2013).
  Reviews Jim Jarmusch's Only Lovers Left Alive (2013) and David Gordon Green's Joe (2013).
  Reviews Pawel Pawlikowski's Ida (2013) and Jon Favreau's Chef (2014).
  Reviews John Michael McDonagh's Calvary (2014) and Jonathan Demme's A Master Builder (2013).
  Reviews Lenny Abrahamson's Frank (2014) and Ira Sachs' Love is Strange (2014).
  Reviews Alejandro González Iñárritu's Birdman (2014) and Damien Chazelle's Whiplash (2014).
  Reviews Paul Thomas Anderson's Inherent Vice (2014).

2015–2019
  Reviews Barry Levinson's The Humbling (2014) and Abderrahmane Sissako's Timbuktu (2014).
  Reviews Matthew Vaughn's Kingsman: The Secret Service (2014) and Taika Waititi and Jemaine Clement's What We Do in the Shadows (2014). 
  Reviews Kenneth Branagh's Cinderella (2015) and David Robert Mitchell's It Follows (2014).
  Reviews Alex Garland's Ex Machina (2014) and Asghar Farhadi's About Elly (2009).
  Reviews Olivier Assayas' Clouds of Sils Maria (2014).
  Reviews Joss Whedon's Avengers : Age of Ultron (2015) and Thomas Vinterberg's Far from the Madding Crowd (2015).
  Reviews Andrew Niccol's  Good Kill and John Maclean's Slow West.
  Reviews George Miller's Mad Max: Fury Road (2015).
  Reviews Peter Docter's Inside Out (2015) and Andrea Di Stefano's Escobar : Paradise Lost (2014).
  Reviews Judd Apatow's Trainwreck (2015) and Bill Condon's Mr. Holmes (2015).
  Reviews Peyton Reed's Ant-Man and Joshua Oppenheimer's The Look of Silence.
  Reviews Todd Haynes' Carol (2015) and Brian Helgeland's Legend (2015).
  Reviews Justin Kurzel's Macbeth (2015) and Paolo Sorrentino's Youth (2015).
  Reviews Gavin O'Connor's Jane Got a Gun and J. Blakeson's The Fifth Wave.
  Reviews Robert Eggers' The Witch.
  Shane Black's The Nice Guys and Whit Stillman's Love & Friendship.
  Woody Allen's Café Society (2016) and Roger Ross Williams' Life, Animated (2016).
  Reviews Paul Greengrass's Jason Bourne (2016) and Ira Sachs' Little Men (2016).
  Reviews Andrea Arnold's American Honey (2016) and Peter Berg's Deepwater Horizon (2016).
  Mel Gibson's Hacksaw Ridge and Jeff Nichols' Loving.
  Mike Mills' 20th Century Women and Pedro Almodóvar's Julieta.
  Jim Jarmusch's Paterson and Pablo Larraín's Neruda.
  Reviews Jordan Vogt-Roberts's Kong : Skull Island (2017) and Julia Ducournau's Raw (2016).
 
  Reviews Terence Davies' A Quiet Passion (2016) and F. Gary Gray's The Fate of the Furious (2017).
 
  Reviews Ken Loach's I, Daniel Blake (2016) and Miguel Arteta's Beatriz at Dinner (2017).
  Reviews Edgar Wright's Baby Driver (2017) and Bertrand Tavernier's  (2016).
  Reviews Josh Safdie and Benny Safdie's Good Time (2017) and Bertrand Bonello's Nocturama (2016).
  Reviews Yorgos Lanthimos' The Killing of a Sacred Deer (2017) and Ruben Östlund's The Square (2017).
  Reviews George Clooney's Suburbicon (2017) and Richard Linklater's Last Flag Flying (2017).
  Reviews Luca Guadagnino's Call Me by Your Name (2017).
  Reviews Andrey Zvyagintsev's Loveless (2017) and Brian Crano's Permission (2017).
  Reviews Steven Soderbergh's Unsane (2018) and Aaron Katz's Gemini (2017).
  Reviews Richard Eyre's The Children Act (2018) and Robert Greene's Bisbee '17 (2018).
  Reviews Jon S. Baird's Stan & Ollie (2018) and Karyn Kusama's Destroyer (2018).
  Reviews Florian Henckel von Donnersmarck's Never Look Away (2018).
  Reviews Ty Robert's The Iron Orchard and Christian Petzold's Transit (2018).
  Reviews Kenneth Branagh's All Is True (2018) and Dome Karukoski's Tolkien (2019).
  Reviews Olivia Wilde's Booksmart (2019) and Joanna Hogg's The Souvenir (2019).
  Reviews Guy Ritchie's Aladdin (2019) and Denys Arcand's The Fall of the American Empire (2018).
  Reviews James Mangold's Ford v Ferrari (2019) and Mike Flanagan's Doctor Sleep (2019).

2020–
  Reviews Greta Gerwig's Little Women (2019).
  Reviews Ladj Ly's Les Misérables (2019) and Chinonye Chukwu's Clemency (2019).
  Reviews Benjamin Ree's The Painter and the Thief (2020) and Michael Winterbottom's The Trip to Greece (2020).
  Reviews Armando Iannucci's The Personal History of David Copperfield (2019).
  Reviews Thomas Vinterberg's Another Round (2020) and Ryan Murphy's The Prom (2020).
  Reviews Dominic Cooke's The Courier (2020) and Anthony Scott Burns' Come True (2020).
  Reviews Andreas Fontana's Azor (2021) and Natalie Morales's Language Lessons'' (2021).

Notes

Bibliographies by writer
Bibliographies of British writers